Kristina Mah is an Australian karateka. She is a gold medalist at the World Karate Championships.

Career 

In 2010, she won the gold medal in the women's kumite 61 kg event at the 2010 World Karate Championships held in Belgrade, Serbia. In 2012, she was eliminated from the competition in the same event at 2012 World Karate Championships by Boutheina Hasnaoui of Tunisia. Hasnaoui went on to win the silver medal. In 2013, she won the silver medal in the women's kumite 61 kg event at the 2013 World Combat Games held in Saint Petersburg, Russia.

In 2017, she represented Australia at the 2017 World Games held in Wrocław, Poland in the women's kumite 61 kg event. She was eliminated from the competition by Alexandra Grande of Peru. Grande went on to win the gold medal.

In 2021, she competed at the World Olympic Qualification Tournament held in Paris, France hoping to qualify for the 2020 Summer Olympics in Tokyo, Japan.

Achievements

References

External links 
 

Living people
Place of birth missing (living people)
Australian female karateka
Competitors at the 2017 World Games
Year of birth missing (living people)